Ewe Cote is a small hamlet on the edge of the North York Moors National Park, set in the northern edge of the civil parish of Whitby, in the Scarborough district of North Yorkshire, England. According to the 2011 UK census, Ewe Cote has a population of 11.

Geography 
The hamlet of Ewe Cote is situated within a small sheltered cirque drainage basin. The bedrock geology is Moor Grit Member (Quartz sandstone) and Glaciofluvial superficial Deposits (Sand and Gravel).
The Upgang Beck springs from the cirque and flows via the hamlet down through the Whitby Golf Course onto Upgang Beach.

History 
Ewe Cote Hall and the Ewe Cote Hall garden walls are both Grade II* listed structures.

Notable residents 
Francis Meadow (Frank) Sutcliffe (1853-1941): was a pioneering photographer. In the census of 1871, the Sutcliffe's are listed as living at Ewe Cote Hall and Frank is described as a photographer and artist's assistant. Today, Frank Sutcliffe's work is highly acclaimed for his pioneering black and white photographs of working people, bringing worldwide attention to Whitby.

Anecdotes 
Captain Lawrence Edward Grace Oates stayed at Ewe Cote Hall as a guest of the Sutcliffe's prior to his fateful journey on the Terra Nova Expedition to the South Pole.
 Scenes from the TV series Heartbeat were filmed at Ewe Cote Hall in Season 8 Episode 24 "Testament" (1998).

References 

Villages in North Yorkshire
Hamlets in North Yorkshire